Eddington Varmah is a Liberian politician. He served as Justice Minister in the administration of President Charles Taylor. After Taylor resigned from office in mid-2003, Varmah was chosen as Deputy Speaker of the National Transitional Legislative Assembly of Liberia (NTLA).

References

Living people
Year of birth missing (living people)
Justice ministers of Liberia
Members of the National Transitional Legislative Assembly of Liberia